Marlowe is a 1981 musical with a book by Leo Rost, lyrics by Rost and Jimmy Horowitz, and music by Horowitz. Despite a claim in the Playbill that "the story of this drama is essentially true and accurate," much of it is a fictionalized account of the life of Elizabethan playwright Christopher Marlowe.

Overview
While the plot refers to his rebellious anti-clerical views, the main focus is on Marlowe's romantic relationship with Emelia Bossano, a woman he supposedly lured away from William Shakespeare. Other historical figures who put in an appearance are Richard Burbage, Matthew Parker, Ingram Frizer, and Queen Elizabeth I.

In keeping with the general rock music tone of the score, neither the set nor costume designs (miniskirts, Day-Glo tights and silver lamé jumpsuits) suggested the show was a period piece, although the action is set in 1593.

Production
The Broadway production was directed and choreographed by Don Price. The musical opened at the Rialto Theatre on October 12, 1981, and ran for 48 performances and 8 previews. The cast included Patrick Jude as Marlowe, Lisa Mordente as Emelia, John Henry Kurtz as Burbage, Raymond Serra as Parker, Robert Rosen (who later performed under the pseudonyms OZN and Robert Ozn) as Frizer, and Margaret Warncke as the Queen. Mordente was nominated for the Tony Award for Best Performance by a Leading Actress in a Musical.

In his review in The New York Times, Frank Rich described Marlowe as "a wholly ridiculous show that is much more fun to sit through than many merely mediocre musicals . . . If Marlowe isn't quite a classic of its kind, that's a matter of size, not content. Tacky-looking and sparsely populated, this show lacks the Titaniclike splendor and expenditure of Broadway's all-time fabulous wrecks."

While the production stopped performances after Sunday, November 22, 1981, the box office remained open, in the hopes that more tickets would be sold for the future. On December 1, the box office closed.

Song list

Act 1      
Prologue
Rocking the Boat
Because I'm a Woman
Live for the Moment
Emelia
I'm Coming 'Round to Your Point of View
The Ends Justify the Means
Higher Than High
Rocking the Boat (Reprise)

Act 2      
Prologue
Christopher
So So I (Ode to Virginity)
Two Lovers
The Funeral Dirge
Live for the Moment (Reprise)
Emelia (Reprise)
Can't Leave Now
Christopher (Reprise)
The Madrigal Blues

References

External links
Internet Broadway Database entry
New York Times review
New York Times feature article

1981 musicals
Broadway musicals
Christopher Marlowe